The 2005 CCHA Men's Ice Hockey Tournament was the 34th CCHA Men's Ice Hockey Tournament. It was played between March 11 and March 19, 2005. Opening round games were played at campus sites, while all "super six" games were played at Joe Louis Arena in Detroit, Michigan. By winning the tournament, Michigan won the Mason Cup and received the Central Collegiate Hockey Association's automatic bid to the 2005 NCAA Division I Men's Ice Hockey Tournament.

Format
The tournament featured four rounds of play. In the first round, the first and twelfth seeds, the second and eleventh seeds, the third seed and tenth seeds, the fourth seed and ninth seeds, the fifth seed and eighth seeds, and the sixth seed and seventh seeds played a best-of-three series, with the two highest-seeded winners advancing to the semifinals and the remaining four winners playing in the quarterfinals. In the quarterfinals, the highest and lowest seeds and second highest and second lowest seeds play a single-game, with the winner advancing to the semifinals. In the semifinals, the highest and lowest seeds and second highest and second lowest seeds play a single-game, with the winner advancing to the championship game and the loser advancing to the third place game. The tournament champion receives an automatic bid to the 2005 NCAA Men's Division I Ice Hockey Tournament.

Conference standings
Note: GP = Games played; W = Wins; L = Losses; T = Ties; PTS = Points; GF = Goals For; GA = Goals Against

Bracket

Note: * denotes overtime period(s)

First round

(1) Michigan vs. (12) Notre Dame

(2) Ohio State vs. (11) Ferris State

(3) Northern Michigan vs. (10) Western Michigan

(4) Nebraska-Omaha vs. (9) Lake Superior State

(5) Bowling Green vs. (8) Alaska-Fairbanks

(6) Michigan State vs. (7) Miami

Quarterfinals

(3) Northern Michigan vs. (8) Alaska-Fairbanks

(4) Nebraska-Omaha vs. (6) Michigan State

Semifinals

(1) Michigan vs. (8) Alaska-Fairbanks

(2) Ohio State vs. (6) Michigan State

Third Place

(6) Michigan State vs. (8) Alaska-Fairbanks

Championship

(1) Michigan vs. (2) Ohio State

Tournament awards

All-Tournament Team
F Ryan McLeod (Alaska-Fairbanks)
F Tom Fritsche (Ohio State)
F Jeff Tambellini* (Michigan)
D Sean Collins (Ohio State)
D Brandon Rogers (Michigan)
G Wylie Rogers (Alaska-Fairbanks)
* Most Valuable Player(s)

Three Stars of the Tournament
3 Wylie Rogers (Alaska-Fairbanks)
2 Tom Fritsche (Ohio State)
1 Jeff Tambellini (Michigan)

References

External links
2006 CCHA Men's Ice Hockey Tournament

CCHA Men's Ice Hockey Tournament
Ccha tournament